Parkside Media is a diversified media organization involved in print, television and online publishing as well as advertising, event management and public relations, among other client services.

Magazines
It is one of the country’s largest independent magazine publishers. Its offices are in Eden Terrace, Auckland. Owner Greg Vincent established the company in 1990 when he founded New Zealand Classic Car magazine. The company went on to launch two more monthly motoring titles, NZ Performance Car in 1996 and NZV8 in 2005, which have proven durable with a loyal readership.

Parkside launched bi-monthly photography magazine D-Photo in 2004 and acquired another bi-monthtly, The Shed magazine, in 2017. It launched automotive trade magazine Auto Channel in 2018. Auto Channel is distributed free to the automotive industry each month.

Parkside publishes hardcover books and special editions on motoring events and celebrities, as well as calendars and other collateral.

Parkside Media publishes:
NZ Performance Car
NZ Classic Car
NZV8
D-Photo
The Shed

Television
Parkside Media has produced NZ Performance Car TV in-house, a television show that aligns with NZ Performance Car magazine, and NZV8 TV which aligns with NZV8. NZV8 TV was presented by Andy Booth, former New Zealand V8s championship-winning driver.

Internet
Parkside runs over 20 websites such as new car review site Car and SUV, several ecommerce sites, and websites for its magazine publications.

Mobile
Parkside Media pioneered mobile publishing in New Zealand as one of the largest content suppliers to the Vodafone network in New Zealand for ringtones, screen wallpapers and video. It now publishes Drift Legends and other iPhone applications.

Events
Parkside Media organises the NZ Drift Series, Super Lap and Import All-Stars. It has previously organised various model search and motorsport events, and is a key sponsor of Intermarque Concours d'Elegance.

Awards
Cam Leggett, designer since issue 68 of NZ Performance Car has won two awards for Designer of the Year at the MPA Awards in the Special Interest Category in 2007 and 2008.
Greg Vincent was the recipient of The Meguiar's Awards in 2004.

References

External links
 
 Magazine audit data

Publishing companies of New Zealand
Television production companies of New Zealand
Mass media in Auckland